The Victorian English Gentlemens Club is the debut album by The Victorian English Gentlemens Club.

Track listing
 "The Tales of Hermit Mark" – 2:52
 "Stupid as Wood" – 2:55
 "My Son Spells Backwards" – 1:55
 "Impossible Sightings Over Shelton" – 3:27
 "Such a Chore" – 2:13
 "Dead Anyway" – 3:27
 "Ban the Gin" – 2:15
 "Amateur Man" – 2:39
 "A Hundred Years of the Street" – 2:13
 "Under the Yews" – 2:34
 "Cannonball" – 4:24

References

2006 debut albums
The Victorian English Gentlemens Club albums
Fantastic Plastic Records albums